Family with Sequence Similarity 166, member B, or FAM166B, is an uncharacterized protein in humans that is encoded by the FAM166B gene.

Gene 
The FAM166B gene is located on the short arm of chromosome 9 at 9p13.3 on the minus strand. The genomic sequence spans 2,069 base pairs from 35563899 to 35561830. Gene neighbors are RUSC2, RPS29P17, and TESK1.

Expression 
FAM166B is expressed 0.5 times higher than average in humans. FAM166B is highly expressed in the adrenal gland, fallopian tube, and respiratory epithelial tissues. It is weakly to moderately expressed in skeletal muscle and heart muscle.

Promoter 
FAM166B is predicted to have a promoter that spans 680 bp and includes the 5' UTR.

mRNA 
In humans, FAM166B has 10 transcript variants, which are all spliced.  FAM166B transcript variant 1 is 1,092 bp in length and contains 6 total exons. The accession number for this variant is NM_001164310.

Protein 
The amino acid sequence is 275 amino acids in length and contains 3 DUF 2475 regions. The three DUF2475 regions are located from amino acids 15 to 80, 174 to 234, and 234 to 261.The predicted molecular weight is 30.6 kdal with the predicted isoelectric point of 8.414. It is known to have a higher than normal proline composition compared to other human proteins at 12.4%. The protein has a negative charged region from residues 141 to 172.

1    MAVASTFIPGLNPQNPHYIPGYTGHCPLLRFSVGQTYGQVTGQLLRGPPGLAWPPVHRTLLPPIRPPRSP
71   EVPRESLPVRRGQERLSSSMIPGYTGFVPRAQFIFAKNCSQVWAEALSDFTHLHEKQGSEELPKEAKGRK
141  DTEKDQVPEPEGQLEEPTLEVVEQASPYSMDDRDPRKFFMSGFTGYVPCARFLFGSSFPVLTNQALQEFG
211  QKHSPGSAQDPKHLPPLPRTYPQNLGLLPNYGGYVPGYKFQFGHTFGHLTHDALGLSTFQKQLLA

Post-Translational Modifications 
FAM166B is predicted to have 12 phosphorylation, 3 sumoylation, and 1 acetylation sites. FAM166 has no predicted signal peptide sequences.

Structure 
FAM166B is predicted to be composed mostly of coils with short interspersed regions of alpha helices and beta sheets. There are no predicted transmembrane domains and this is consistent through orthologs.

Subcellular Localization
However, the intracellular location of FAM166B is unknown. The average hydrophobicity of the protein is -0.519272, which suggests that it is a soluble protein.

Homology

Orthologs 
FAM166B has a number of orthologs in mammals, birds, reptiles, fish, and some invertebrates. The table below lists a number of FAM166B orthologs that were found using BLAST. The table descending exhibits the diversity of species with FAM166B orthologs in descending order of identity.

Paralogs 
FAM166B has one paralog, FAM166A, which spans 317 aa and has a 25% identity. The accession number for FAM166A is  NP_001001710.

Clinical Significance

Diseases 
Currently, FAM166 is not associated within a human disease or condition. Despite being located on Spastic paraplegia 46, a locus on chromosome 9, that is known to cause an autosomal-recessive disease called hereditary spastic paraplegia (HSP), FAM166B was determined not to be the gene responsible for the disease due to its frequency in the population controls. FAM166B was excluded from a patent looking for genes that are prognosis predictors for classic Hodgkin's lymphoma (cHL).

References  

Human proteins